Andrea Martí  (born 31 August 1987 in Mexico City, Mexico) is a Mexican actress.

Biography 
Andrea Martí was born on 31 August 1987 in Mexico City. She started her career in 2008 in the TV series   Pobre rico...pobre. Her first main role was in 2009 in the series Mujer comprada as the partner of José Ángel Llamas. In 2012 she starred in the soap opera La mujer de Judas along with Anette Michel, Víctor González, Géraldine Bazán and Daniel Elbittar.

Filmography

Sources 
 

Mexican women artists
1987 births
Living people
Actresses from Mexico City
21st-century Mexican actresses